Norman Gershom Flagg (August 4, 1867 – May 16, 1948) was an American businessman, farmer, and politician.

Biography
Flagg was born in Liberty Prairie, Madison County, Illinois. He went to the local public schools and graduated from Washington University in St. Louis. He was a farmer and was involved with farm mutual insurance. Flagg lived in Moro, Illinois with his wife and family. Flagg served on the Madison County Bar of Supervisors and was a Republican. He served in the Illinois House of Representatives from 1909 to 1927. Flagg then served in the Illinois Senate from 1927 to 1931 and from 1939 to 1947. He died at his home in Liberty Prairie, Illinois, from a long illness. His father Willard Cutting Flagg also served in the Illinois General Assembly.

References

External links

1867 births
1948 deaths
People from Madison County, Illinois
Washington University in St. Louis alumni
Businesspeople from Illinois
Farmers from Illinois
County board members in Illinois
Republican Party members of the Illinois House of Representatives
Republican Party Illinois state senators